Bouges-le-Château is a commune in the Indre department in central France.

Population

See also
Communes of the Indre department

References
 Château de Bouges in Google Cultural Institute

Communes of Indre